Paddle-ball is a sport that is played on a court half the size of a tennis court, using paddle racquets amongst two players (single game) or in doubles with two teams consisting of two players. The Paddle-ball paddle is made of wood or graphite and has holes for less air friction. Below are the instructions for single games.

Necessary Equipment
To play paddle-ball, it is necessary to have a paddle (resembling a racquetball paddle) that is no longer than 18 inches and no wider than 9 1/2 inches. The Paddle-ball is made of plastic paddleball, the size of a softball. Air holes in the ball give to it less friction. Paddleballs come in yellow and light green.

Court
Paddle-ball is normally played on a court that is 20 feet wide and 50 feet long, with a wall that is 16 feet in height. The court has a short line, a set of service markers, two side lines and a long line. The service zone is the area between the short line and the service markers. At the start of the play, one person must stand inside the service zone and strike the ball against the wall. The server must stay within the service zone until the ball crosses the short line.

Fault, Short, Long
The ball must cross the short line on each serve. The server must stay within the serving box. Once the serve is made, the opponent must hit the ball, knocking it off the wall. If the ball bounces before it crosses the short line, a short is called. However, if the ball bounces beyond the long line, a long out is called. Any service where the server is not within the service zone upon service is called a "fault." The server has a second chance to serve the ball. Failure to successfully serve the ball into the court beyond the short line twice results in the receiver winning the play. The server and the receiver then switch places. The scoring is similar to tennis, with players earning 15, 30, and 40 points before winning the game.

If the serve is good, the receiver must hit the ball before it bounces twice. If the receiver fails to successfully hit the ball back to the wall before its second bounce and have it bounce within the court, then the play stops and the server receives the point. If the receiver hits the ball but it hits the server, the play is restarted if the ball appeared to have hit the wall. Otherwise, the fault is transferred to the receiver, and the server wins the point. After the receiver successfully returns the ball, the server can leave the box and must hit the ball before it bounces twice. The server and receiver then alternate until either the ball bounces twice or the ball falls out of bounds. If the server wins the round, they gain a point. If the receiver wins, they switch spots, and then it is the opponent's turn to serve. If, for example, one player prevents the other from striking the ball, a block is called and the game is restarted. If the striker believes that hitting the ball will endanger another player, a safety can be called and the game restarted. If the server blocks the receiver deliberately, it's out on the server.

Technicalities
SERVING
 Stepping on or over short line, sideline or service marker is a fault.
 Ball is short on serve if the ball does not carry across the short line before bouncing. This is a fault.
 Ball is long on serve if ball carries past the long line without on court bounce or being received. This is a fault.
 Serving between the legs is an automatic fault.
 Server is allowed (1) fault per service point. A second fault means server forfeits serve. This resets every new service point attempt.
 If any serve is wide, the server forfeits the serve.
 If server swings and fails to hit the ball, the server forfeits the serve.
 If served ball hits the ground before hitting the wall, server forfeits the serve.
 Server's partner must remain outside the sideline in between the service line and the short line until the served ball crosses the short line.
RECEIVING SERVE
 Receiver must hit the ball before it bounces twice.
 Receiver must wait until ball crosses service line before returning serve.
 Receiver may hit ball before it bounces.
 If the server crosses their body with a serve, or if the served ball bounces within one foot of the server, a block may be called by receiver, and point is replayed.
GAME PLAY
 If struck ball hits the striker or partner, they forfeit the point.
 Until the ball is struck or bounces twice, player(s) can swing any number of times.
 After hit, ball must hit the wall before it hits the floor.
 Off wall, ball may be returned without bouncing.
 Opponent(s) MAY NOT hinder striker by moving during the strikers swing if they are between striker and wall. If they do, opponents forfeit point to striking team. They may move if they are behind striker, and not impairing the striker's ability to return the ball.
 If striking player lets the ball touch any part of their body, it's out against them.
 If struck ball will hit wall before bouncing, but hits opponent first, play is stopped and point is replayed.
 If struck ball doesn't hit wall before bouncing but hits the opponent, the striker forfeits point.
 If striker's paddle contacts the opponent on forward motion, striker forfeits point.
 If striker's paddle contacts the opponent on back-swing, point is replayed.
 The ball is in play until it bounces twice.
 If paddle is dropped during play, that player forfeits point.
 Player can call "safety" out of fear for injuring opponent with ball or paddle. To call "safety", you must be able to return ball, and immediately call out "block" or "safety". Any needless "safety" call is a penalty.
 If the ball breaks, the game is paused and the point is replayed. Ball's played over if it hits either a foreign object or if a foreign object enters court.

A referee is not necessary in this particular game. It can be played with mutual or compromised agreements amongst the players.

Additional Rules for Single Play
Server can serve anywhere within service box and must serve to major area of the court. A major area is where the server begins serve. If the ball lands anywhere outside the major area, it's out. Serving from middle, server must declare with side of court being served into. Serving into a minor area must be declared or it's a fault.

References

External links
 The United States Paddleball Association, 2006

Racket sports
Forms of tennis
Sports rules and regulations by sport